Elections to Castlereagh Borough Council were held on 20 May 1981 on the same day as the other Northern Irish local government elections. The election used three district electoral areas to elect a total of 19 councillors.

Election results

Note: "Votes" are the first preference votes.

Districts summary

|- class="unsortable" align="centre"
!rowspan=2 align="left"|Ward
! % 
!Cllrs
! % 
!Cllrs
! %
!Cllrs
! % 
!Cllrs
!rowspan=2|TotalCllrs
|- class="unsortable" align="center"
!colspan=2 bgcolor="" | DUP
!colspan=2 bgcolor="" | UUP
!colspan=2 bgcolor="" | Alliance
!colspan=2 bgcolor="white"| Others
|-
|align="left"|Area A
|bgcolor="#D46A4C"|33.4
|bgcolor="#D46A4C"|2
|28.8
|2
|20.9
|1
|16.9
|1
|6
|-
|align="left"|Area B
|bgcolor="#D46A4C"|51.9
|bgcolor="#D46A4C"|4
|24.5
|2
|19.9
|2
|3.7
|0
|8
|-
|align="left"|Area C
|bgcolor="#D46A4C"|55.3
|bgcolor="#D46A4C"|3
|21.3
|1
|23.4
|1
|0.0
|0
|5
|- class="unsortable" class="sortbottom" style="background:#C9C9C9"
|align="left"| Total
|44.8
|9
|25.2
|5
|21.1
|4
|8.9
|1
|19
|-
|}

Districts results

Area A

1977: 2 x Alliance, 2 x UUP, 1 x DUP, 1 x Independent Unionist
1981: 2 x DUP, 2 x UUP, 1 x Alliance, 1 x Independent Unionist
1977-1981 Change: DUP gain from Alliance

Area B

1977: 3 x Alliance, 2 x UUP, 2 x DUP, 1 x Independent Unionist
1981: 4 x DUP, 2 x UUP, 2 x Alliance
1977-1981 Change: DUP (two seats) gain from Alliance and Independent Unionist

Area C

1977: 2 x Alliance, 2 x UUP, 1 x DUP
1981: 3 x DUP, 1 x Alliance, 1 x UUP
1977-1981 Change: DUP (two seats) gain from Alliance and UUP

References

Castlereagh Borough Council elections
Castlereagh